Aubrey Hruby is an investor and co-founder of InsiderPR and Africa Expert Network, and she speaks and writes regularly on African business issues in media.  As a Senior Fellow at the Africa Center, Atlantic Council, she has worked with government agencies and policy-makers on business and is an advisor on Africa-focused investments.

Hruby earned an MBA from the Wharton School at the University of Pennsylvania and an MA from Georgetown University, where she currently teaches. She is the co-author of the award-winning book The Next Africa (Macmillan, 2015)., a term member of the Council on Foreign Relations, and Young Leader at the Milken Institute.

In 2018, Hruby co-founded Tofino Capital, a venture capital firm that targets early-stage startups in emerging markets.

References 

Living people
Wharton School of the University of Pennsylvania alumni
Georgetown University alumni
Georgetown University faculty
Atlantic Council
American writers
University of Colorado Boulder alumni
Year of birth missing (living people)